Extremeroller was a steel stand-up roller coaster at Worlds of Fun in Kansas City, Missouri, USA. It was built by Arrow Dynamics and the first stand-up roller coaster in the United States. It was built in 1976 under the name Screamroller. In 1983, Arrow designed a stand-up train for the attraction, which was subsequently renamed Extremeroller (also known as EXT). However, the original sit-down trains were reinstalled in 1984, remaining in place until the attraction was removed in 1988 and replaced by Timber Wolf that opened in 1989. In 1990, Extremeroller was relocated to Formosa WonderWorld in Taipei, Taiwan, as "Spiral" which stood until the end of 2006 when it was removed. It is not known if it has been scrapped or is in storage.  
 
The original station, entrance and a few cement platforms from EXT still remain today (as commonly seen in the water and exit from station). American Coaster Enthusiasts (ACE) still has the stand-up train in storage.

External links
Video of 1983 EXT as stand up

Statistics and history of Extremeroller

Worlds of Fun
Roller coasters introduced in 1976
Amusement rides that closed in 1988
1976 establishments in Missouri
1988 disestablishments in Missouri